Rezvan is a single-stage liquid-propellant missile with a detachable warhead with a range of up to 1,400 kilometers that can be launched from a variety of fixed and mobile platforms. Runs on various desktop and mobile platforms.

The commander of the Islamic Revolutionary Guard Corps (IRGC) touted the Rezvan missile as a missile capable of penetrating the atmosphere at eight times the speed of sound.

See also 

 Haj Qasem (missile)
 Abu Mahdi (missile)
 Ministry of Defence and Armed Forces Logistics (Iran)
 List of military equipment manufactured in Iran
 Science and technology in Iran
 Military of Iran
 Iranian military industry
 Equipment of the Iranian Army

References 

Medium-range ballistic missiles of Iran
Surface-to-surface missiles of Iran
Weapons and ammunition introduced in 2020